The Ornamental Gardens are located at Agriculture and Agri-Food Canada's Central Experimental Farm in Ottawa, Ontario, Canada. Once used as a test facility for the development of winter hardy roses, weigela and peonies, it now acts as the steward to several large collections of ornamentals. Several notable collections include the Explorer rose collection, the Arthur Percy Saunders peonies and the Isabella Preston lilac series.

To provide a proper environment for the many plant collections the Ornamental Gardens has been subdivided into several features. These include the Macoun Memorial Garden, the Lilac Walk, the Rock Garden, the Perennial Border and the Explorer Rose Garden. 
As a display garden for the AAS (All American Selection) the Ornamental Gardens also presents a yearly, dynamic display of the choicest annuals and perennials.

See also
List of botanical gardens in Canada
Dominion Arboretum

External links
Information from the Central Experimental Farm

Parks in Ottawa
Gardens in Canada